"Falling in Love" is the fourth official single by British hip hop artist Ironik, featuring vocals from Canadian actress and singer Jessica Lowndes. It was the first single from Ironik's second album which was never released. The single was released on 24 October 2010 for digital download. It charted at number 40 on the UK Singles Chart on 31 October 2010.

Track listing

Chart performance
The song charted at number 40 on the UK Singles Chart on October 31, 2010.

Release history

References

External links

2010 singles
Ironik songs
2010 songs
Songs written by Ironik